Warners is a hamlet in Onondaga County, New York, United States. Warners is in the Town of Van Buren.

References

Hamlets in New York (state)
Hamlets in Onondaga County, New York